The LaSallian (TLS) is the official student publication of De La Salle University, founded in 1960. It is an English language newspaper, released every first week of every month from September to August, and is run entirely by undergraduate students of DLSU Manila.

History

Founding
The La Sallian was first released as the official student publication of then-De La Salle College on October 24, 1960, under its first Editor in Chief, Polo Santiago Pantaleon. Its name was given by Ernido Agustin in a contest.

In December 1961, The La Sallian released its first lampoon issue, The Judean Journal. In 1963, under EIC Ramon Henson, the publication received “an A1 rating for makeup and photography” from the Columbian Press Association of Columbian University.

In 1967, EIC Jesus Manalastas opens Guest Writer, a column space for editors of student publications outside De La Salle College. During the decade, the publication prominently features articles on student activism and academic freedom.

Under the Marcos regime

From 1972 to 1973, EIC Calixto Chikiamco, rumored to be the leader of the League of Filipino Students, introduced a filipinization of the publication by tackling, among other topics, nationalism, radicalism, Communism, and Maoism. As De La Salle College became co-educational during this period, Irmina Nobleza and Josefina Sayoc became the first female writers of The LaSallian. Noted director Jose “Joey” Reyes writes his first feature article, The Bull's Eye View.

Carmen Reyes becomes TLS’ first female EIC. A fire destroys important documents in the TLS office, and the publication is nearly closed after being found guilty of charges—among them the publication
of an editorial entitled Press Freedom Is Dead — by the University Board Review (an administrative body). DLSC becomes DLSU in 1975.

In 1981, EIC Perry Lim Pe writes the first TLS editorial in Filipino (Mulat). TLS is the first to oppose and report of the University's adoption of the trimester calendar.

In 1983, frustrated by what it saw as Lasallian indifference, the publication releases a special issue detailing the active participation of UP and Ateneo in the opposition movement against President Ferdinand Marcos. TLS’ October 1983 editorial, Manila on the March, details the outpouring of anger against the Marcos Administration in the aftermath of Benigno Aquino's assassination.

TLS 26 to TLS 49
In 1986, shortly after the People Power Revolution, TLS in its June–July issue reports of DLSU's acceptance into the UAAP—six years after withdrawing from the NCAA due to the “Black August” brawl involving several DLSU and Letran men's basketball players.

In 1992, EIC Jonathan Mendoza changes the spelling of the publication's name to The LaSallian.

TLS, in response to the UAAP Board's decision to forfeit its championship win against the Far Eastern University Tamaraws’ men's basketball team, publishes its shortest editorial to date: “80-77. We played the game."

Under EIC Elegio Cabasug (1994-1995), the Features section is renamed Menagerie, with Ariz Convalecer as its editor. A series of deaths related to the university's Reserve Officers' Training Corps hit campus, prompting an official investigation which led to the expulsion of more than 20 students. An inquiry by EIC Luis Laparan and University (News) Editor Edwin Tumbagan in 1995 leads to the closure of several establishments serving alcoholic drinks and allowing the play of billiards. TLS has its first co-editors in chief: Luis Laparan and Angel Fortich, 1996–1997.

Under EIC Faith Santiago (2000-2002), the Menagerie magazine is introduced, and the Spoofs (Cartoons) section is renamed Poptown.

In a controversial move to renew the publication, the TLS Editorial Board led by Sarah Espina changed the nameplate font of the publication from Old English to Times New Roman in 2002.

The LaSallian was named Best Non-Weekly Newspaper by the United States’ Associated Collegiate Press. A TLS website is opened by succeeding EIC Isabelle Yujuico, but is later closed after being hacked.

In 2004, a disciplinary case involving EIC Meryll Yan opens the issue of bureaucracy in student services. A year later, she becomes the first editor to be awarded as Most Outstanding Student Leader in Gawad Mag-aaral's history. TLS becomes the first to give details of the new General Education curriculum (which eventually was implemented in 2006-2007). Poptown is transferred from the Menagerie magazine to the broadsheet.

In 2005, EIC Paul Garilao and University Editor Donelle Gan expose the exploits of a sexually harassing faculty member. TLS covers the University's lead role in the movement to oust Pres. Gloria Arroyo from office, and reports of DLSU's suspension from the UAAP (for fielding ineligible Green Archers). The Multi- Sectoral Committee on Budget sets the lowest ever tuition fee increase at 3.828 percent. TLS releases a tribute in honor of Br. Andrew Gonzalez, who passes away in February 2006.

In 2006, under EIC Donelle Gan, TLS details the formation of De La Salle Philippines, the newly formed overseeing body of all Lasallian schools in the country. Paulo Mutuc and Ross Delantar, through the 2005 TLS anniversary special article Corporate Academics, bag TLS’ first Lasallian Scholarum Award for Outstanding Feature Story on Youth and Education in a School Organ. The LaSallian website is re-launched.

In February 2008, the publication briefly adopted a news magazine layout, drawing controversy with its readers. In his editor's note, Editor in Chief Paulo Mutuc, noted that the change was made to "come up with is a more harmonious marriage between form and function, between what you want to read and what we think you ought to read." After the school year, the majority of staffers voted in favor of the magazine layout, but in order for the by-laws (which states that The LaSallian is a newspaper) to be ratified, two-thirds of the staff should vote for the affirmative. As a result, regular issues will continue to be released in the broadsheet format while some special issues may be released in the magazine format.

In partnership with The Guidon, the official student publication of the Ateneo de Manila University, TLS launches “PressPlay”, a journalism contest and seminar open to college student journalists.

TLS 50 to present
In 2010, TLS celebrates its golden jubilee under EIC Angel Bombarda. DLSU President Br. Armin Luistro FSC accepts the Department of Education secretary post and TLS is first to report about the changes in DLSU leadership. In addition, TLS breaks the news of the construction of the Henry Sy Sr. Hall under the Centennial Renewal Plan. Photo Editor Adi Bontuyan puts up TLS’ Facebook page and a full- time web team handles the TLS website.

In 2011, the community celebrates 100 years of Lasallian presence in the Philippines and TLS releases a Centennial Issue in commemoration under EIC Jessy Go. The LaSallian launches its Twitter account on June 16, mainly to provide live coverage of Pres. Noynoy Aquino's visit to DLSU during the Centennial Celebration. Art & Graphics Editor Jerome de Dios leads the redesign and standardization of the broadsheet layout and the masthead font changes from Times New Roman to Arno Pro. The Menagerie is discontinued as a magazine and is released as a separate broadsheet instead.

In 2012, under EIC Patrick Ong, TLS wins the Top Division Award of the 1st Philippine Student Quill Awards, as well as the Award of Excellence for its social media presence. The editorial board creates The LaSallian's Instagram account.

In 2014, TLS is named the third Best Non-Weekly Newspaper by the United States’ Associated Collegiate Press while Menagerie Editor Ysmael Suarez bags the Best Feature award.

From 2015 to 2016, EIC Ronaldo Manzano spearheads TLS’ coverage of Pope Francis’ Apostolic Visit to the Philippines. All TLS social media accounts grow exponentially, with the Facebook page first breaking 100,000, then 150,000 likes. The Layout section is separated from the Arts & Graphics section while the Web section is formalized, with Marinel Mamac and Angelika Tirona serving as the first Layout and Web Editors, respectively. Under succeeding EIC Marinel Mamac, TLS delivers live updates and extended coverage of both Pres. Noynoy Aquino's last SONA, and the 2016 Philippine National Elections. TLS bags several prizes in the Philippine Student Quill Awards.

In 2017, TLS 57 provided live coverage of the Lasallian initiatives and protests against the Marcos Burial in the Libingan ng mga Bayani.

The Editorial Board successfully launches PressPlay 2017 in partnership with The GUIDON after previous efforts to discontinue the event.

The LaSallian's Twitter account is officially verified, and breaks 50,000 followers.

Sections
The LaSallian has eight sections, half being the writing sections while the rest are technical sections. These are:
University - The news section of the publication. It reports and analyzes university and national issues.
Menagerie - The features section, usually featuring articles on culture inside and outside the university.
Sports - Reports on all aspects of the university's sports activities.
Vanguard - The science writing section advances its readers to further understand, grasp, and discern the developments in the field of science and technology.
Art & Graphics - Provides art for the publication. They are also responsible for Poptown or Cartoons page of TLS.
 Layout - Shapes the readers’ experience by providing and arranging the visual elements needed to capture the spirit and significance of every story.
 Photo - Provides evocative images for the publication to visually enhance articles for a more effective reader experience.
 Web - Manages online content of TLS on their website and social media platforms.

PressPlay
During SY 2007-2008, The LaSallian and Ateneo de Manila University's official newspaper, The GUIDON, started an annual student press convention called PressPlay in cooperation with the National Union of Journalists of the Philippines (NUJP). It features seminars in writing, editing, photography, and art. Contests are also held for the participants, composed of other student publications. The seminar is held annually on January, and is done alternately in the Ateneo and La Salle campuses.

References

Student newspapers published in Metro Manila
Newspapers established in 1960
De La Salle University
Weekly newspapers published in the Philippines